Xiamen Air (IATA code: MF, ICAO code: CXA) also knows as Xiamen Airlines, is an airline based in Xiamen, China. Xiamen Air has its northern headquarters in Beijing and eight branches in Fuzhou, Hangzhou, Tianjin, Hunan, Beijing, Quanzhou, Chongqing and Shanghai, and two subsidiaries in Hebei Airlines (99.47% shareholding) and Jiangxi Airlines (60% shareholding, based on the former Xiamen Airlines Nanchang Branch). Founded on July 25, 1984, Xiamen Airlines is the first airline in China to operate independently as an enterprise. It was established as a joint venture between the Shanghai Administration of Civil Aviation Administration of China, Xiamen Special Economic Zone Construction Development Company (now Xiamen C&D Group) and Fujian Investment Enterprise Company. The shareholders are China Southern Airlines Corporation (55%), Xiamen C&D Group (34%) and Fujian Investment and Development Group (11%). The current chairman of Xiamen Airlines is Zhao Dong and the general manager is Wang Zhixue.

Xiamen Airlines operates more than 320 domestic and international routes from Xiamen Gaoqi International Airport, Beijing Daxing International Airport, Fuzhou Changle International Airport and Hangzhou Xiaoshan International Airport, with 3,500 to 4,000 flights per week and carries nearly 25 million passengers per year. Xiamen Airlines' logo is "A Heron Flying High", a well-known trademark in China, and its frequent flyer program is the Xiamen Airlines White Egret Frequent Flyer Program. The airline features in-flight announcements in Mandarin and English, but also in Minnan, which are broadcast by Xia Hui, a former broadcaster for the Central People's Radio station and Xiamen Broadcasting Company.；

Xiamen Airlines is the 19th member of the international airline alliance SkyTeam and the first airline in mainland China to join the world's three major airline alliances other than other three major state-owned airlines (including China Southern, which withdrew from SkyTeam on January 1, 2019) and Shanghai Airlines, which joined the alliance as an affiliate member, and the fourth full member of SkyTeam in Greater China (the first three being China Southern, China Eastern, and China Airlines, of which China Southern withdrew from the alliance on January 1, 2019).

History

Xiamen Civil Aviation 

The history of Xiamen's aviation industry can be traced back to the Xiamen Wutong Civil Aviation Academy in 1928, which was one of the only three aviation academy in the Republic of China at that time.

In 1929, the Zhangxia Navy established the Zengcuo Aun Naval Airport in Xiamen, and in 1932, the China Airlines Xiamen Office, a joint venture between China and the United States, operated air transportation to various places. Later, the airport was abandoned due to the Japanese invasion of China.

In 1941, during the Second World War, the Japanese who occupied Xiamen built Gaoqi Airport in the east of Gaoqi Village for both military and civilian use. From December 5 of the same year, first commercial flight between Xiamen and Taipei took off and landed at Gaoqi Airport.

After Japan's defeat and surrender, Gaoqi Airport was taken over by the Nationalist government and converted to a civilian airport on November 1, 1947. on August 24, 1949, the last scheduled Xiamen to Taipei flight took off from Gaoqi Airport to Taipei and then was discontinued (the route was not converted to a regular service until 2006 when holiday charters resumed and after December 2008). For the next 33 years, Xiamen's aviation industry was disrupted and Gaoqi Airport was abandoned after a brief period of military use.

After the founding of the People's Republic of China, Xiamen was in a state of war for a long time and had no civil aviation airport of its own because of its location on the front of the Taiwan Strait. At that time, the citizens of Xiamem could only travel by boat or train.This contradiction was even more prominent after the establishment of Xiamen Special Economic Zone. On January 10, 1982, the Central Military Commission and the State Council approved the construction of Xiamen Gaoqi Airport. In October of the following year.

However, the airport had no airline that operated as a hub, and still could not solve the issue of lack of capacity. At the opening ceremony of Xiamen Airport, Zhang Ru, Vice Governor of Fujian Province Government, proposed to Shen Tu, Director of the Civil Aviation Administration of China (CAAC), who attended the opening ceremony, that the CAAC and Fujian Province cooperate to establish an airline company, and received support on the spot. Immediately afterwards, the CPC Fujian Provincial Committee assigned Vice Governor Zhang Ru and Vice Mayor of Xiamen City Xiang Zhen to work with Director Wang Dao of the Planning Department of CAAC to study the establishment of an airline company.

Founding 
On October 16, 1983, the chairman of Aloha Airlines, Chen Qing who is a Chinese American, visited Xiamen to study the plan of establishing a Sino-foreign joint venture airline in Xiamen. Wu Zhongliang, who was involved in the establishment of Xiamen Airlines at that time, recalled that Aloha Airlines even had the intention of moving its base to Xiamen at that time.

On January 10, 1984, the Xiamen Municipal Government drafted the "Conceptual Plan and Opinions on Sino-foreign Joint Venture to Operate China Xiamen Special Zone United Airlines Co. Ltd." On January 25, representatives from Fujian Province and Xiamen City went to the Civil Aviation Administration of China (CAAC) for project report, mentioning that priority would be given to joint undertakings by CAAC and Fujian Province as long as aircraft and funds were guaranteed. Subsequently, the CAAC, Fujian Province and Xiamen City held a special meeting on the proposed joint venture airline proposal, and finally rejected the joint venture airline proposal drawn up by the Xiamen City Government on the basis of air rights and other issues.

On March 2, 1984, the Civil Aviation Administration of China and Fujian Provincial Government jointly issued the "Approval of Agreement on Joint Venture Operation of Xiamen Airlines Co. Ltd. Xiamen Air Co. Ltd was officially established on July 25, 1984 as the first comprehensive local airline company and the first joint venture between the central and local governments. Gaoqi Airport have being chosen for the base of this new funded airline.

At the early years of the airline, Xiamen Airlines set itself as a regional airline, but the investment of 20 million RMB from the three shareholders was not available at the beginning of its establishment, and it only registered with a bank account with 5,000 RMB, without any aircraft and livery.

On January 5, 1985 9:55 a.m , a wet-lease Boeing 737 airliner of Xiamen Airlines landed safely at Beijing Capital Airport at 12:27 p.m. after 2 hours and 32 minutes of flight time, which was the first route opened by Xiamen Airlines. In the afternoon, the company's second route, Xiamen-Guangzhou, was also officially opened, with the participation of Jiang Ping, vice mayor of Xiamen, and leaders of Xiamen Airlines, etc. On January 10, the company opened its third route, Xiamen-Shanghai. In these routes, the aircraft of Civil Aviation Administration of Shanghai operates Shanghai-Xiamen and Xiamen-Guangzhou routes once per week; the aircraft of Civil Aviation Administration of Guangzhou (the predecessor of China Southern Airlines) operates Guangzhou-Xiamen, Xiamen-Beijing routes and Xiamen-Hong Kong charter flights once per week. -On February 12, 1985, Xiamen Airlines leased its first 737-200 aircraft, and on December 18, 1985, the third meeting of the first board of directors and the first meeting of the second board of directors of Xiamen Airlines decided to transfer the shares of the Civil Aviation Administration of Shanghai for Xiamen Airlines to the Civil Aviation Administration of Guangzhou, with the same ratio of capital contribution from each party. The agreement of joint venture operation of Xiamen Airlines by the three shareholders and the articles of association of Xiamen Airlines were amended and submitted for approval and became effective on January 1, 1986. On November 16, the first B737-200 aircraft was transferred from Guangzhou to Xiamen as the base of Xiamen Airlines. In November 1987, Xiamen Airlines introduced the second B737-200 aircraft, and in this year, Xiamen Airlines reversed the operating loss of the first three years and made a profit of  3.17 million RMB for the first time.

Expansion 

Xiamen Airlines has made innovative breakthroughs in corporate organization, operation and management, and transportation services. At the time of its establishment, Xiamen Airlines was positioned as an independently-accounted, self-financing limited liability company. In 1989, reforms were made to the organization, personnel management, labor distribution, housing system, medical insurance, and employee benefits, etc. In 1997, the contract system for employees was implemented.

On November 16, 1986, the first aircraft of Xiamen Airlines was transferred from Guangzhou to Xiamen to start its operation. In the same year, Xiamen Airlines bid farewell to its losses and opened the curtain on 27 years of continuous profitability. August 8, 1988, Xiamen Airlines took over the ownership of its first new passenger aircraft from Boeing (Xiamen Airlines had previously operated old aircraft sold to Xiamen Airlines by China Southern Airlines and Southwest Airlines). The aircraft was a Boeing 737-25C Advanced (registration number B-2524), the last Boeing 737 classic airliner produced by Boeing Civil Aircraft. The aircraft was retired from service in 2003 and resold to Blue Dart Express.

In 1991, the General Administration of Civil Aviation (GACA) approved Xiamen Airlines to adopt "Blue Sky and White Heron" as its corporate logo. In the same year, the Civil Aviation Administration separated the government and enterprises and established China Southern Airlines, and the shares held by the Civil Aviation Guangzhou Administration were transferred to China Southern Airlines.

On August 12, 1992, Xiamen Airlines took delivery of its first Boeing 757-200 aircraft, registered as B-2819, which was also the 100th aircraft delivered to the Chinese civil aviation system by Boeing. This aircraft was retired in 2008 and sold to Blue Dart Aviation who converted the aircraft to a cargo plane.

In 2000, Xiamen Airlines launched the service between Xiamen and Bangkok, which was the first international service of Xiamen Airlines fly as MF897/8.

On July 25, 2012, Xiamen Airlines changed its VI logo for the first time from "Blue Sky with White Heron" to "One Heron Flying High", and the aircraft painting theme was changed from "Reform Music" to "Sea and Sky". The theme of the aircraft painting was changed from "Reform Music" to "Sea and Sky". To upgrade the logo of Xiamen Airlines, the Chinese design master Chen Youjian and TEAGUE, the design team appointed by Boeing, were invited to design, revise and prove the new corporate logo after repeatedly.

On December 1, 2018, Xiamen Airlines' last Boeing 757 (No. B-2868) was retired after its last flight from Shanghai Hongqiao-Xiamen, and since then there have been no Boeing 757 passenger aircraft in Greater China.

As China's aviation sector developed, the airline expanded to regional Asian destinations while the delivery of wide-body Boeing 787 Dreamliners permitted the airline to offer long-distance services. The airline's first intercontinental expansion was to Europe, which commenced with an Amsterdam service from July 26, 2015, and a Paris service from December 11, 2018. Services to Sydney followed from November 30, 2015, and Melbourne a year later. The airline's first North American service, to Vancouver was launched on July 26, 2016. XiamenAir's first US service was to Seattle followed by Los Angeles and then New York.

By early 2020, the airline had set up bases at Fuzhou Changle International Airport, Nanchang Changbei International Airport, Hangzhou Xiaoshan International Airport, Tianjin Binhai International Airport, Changsha Huanghua International Airport, Beijing Daxing International Airport（moved from Beijing Capital International Airport in 2020）, Quanzhou Jinjiang International Airport, Chongqing Jiangbei International Airport and Shanghai Hongqiao International Airport.

On November 17 of the same year, SkyTeam officially announced the details of Xiamen Airlines' membership in the alliance and signed a letter of intent to join the alliance in Rome, Italy; on November 21, 2012, Xiamen Airlines officially became the 19th member of SkyTeam and added three new hubs to the alliance - Xiamen, Fuzhou and Hangzhou making it the first airline in China to join one of the three global airline alliances, in addition to the three major state-owned airlines (of which China Southern, the parent company of Xiamen Airlines, withdrew from SkyTeam on January 1, 2019) and Shanghai Airlines, which joined the alliance as a subsidiary member.

Destinations

Alliance
On 17 November 2011, XiamenAir signed a Memorandum of Understanding with the airline alliance SkyTeam. On 21 November 2012, the airline was officially welcomed as the 19th member of SkyTeam.

Codeshare agreements
XiamenAir has codeshare agreements with the following airlines:

 Air France (Joint Venture Partner)
 China Eastern Airlines
 China Southern Airlines (Joint Venture Partner)
 Garuda Indonesia
 Japan Airlines
 KLM (Joint Venture Partner)
 Korean Air
 Malaysia Airlines
 Mandarin Airlines
 Philippine Airlines
 Saudia
 Vietnam Airlines

Joint Venture agreements
XiamenAir has joint venture agreements with the following airlines
 Air France
 China Southern Airlines
 KLM

Fleet
As of January 2023, the fleet size (including subsidiaries Jiangxi Airlines and Hebei Airlines) reached 163 aircraft and 27 aircraft on order, with an average aircraft age of 9.2 years.

However, with Xiamen Airlines to formally introduce 15 Airbus A321neo under operating leases in October 2022, and form a series of Airbus protection systems. Xiamen Airlines will end the record of 37 years of full Boeing fleet since its foundation and start a new era of "Airbus-Boeing" fleet.

, XiamenAir operates a fleet of Airbus and Boeing composed of the following aircraft:

Currently, Xiamen Airlines provides first class services with business class seats on domestic routes in China as usual. On international and regional routes, business class and economy class services are offered as usual.The Boeing 787-8 has 180-degree lie-flat seats in both First and Business Class, and is equipped with Panasonic EX3 personal TV entertainment system with charging outlets and USB ports in all three classes. B-2760, B-2761, B-2762, and later 787-9 with in-flight Wi-Fi access.

Fleet history
XiamenAir has previously operated the following aircraft:
 Boeing 737-200
 Boeing 737-300
 Boeing 737-500
 Boeing 757-200

Accidents and incidents
 On October 2, 1990, Xiamen Airlines Flight 8301 from Xiamen to Guangzhou, a Boeing 737-200 jetliner, was hijacked shortly after takeoff and collided with two additional aircraft upon landing at Baiyun International Airport, killing 128 people.
 On April 30, 2008, Xiamen Airlines Flight 8052, a Boeing 737-700 registered B-2992, nearly collided with China Southern Airlines Flight 6621 on the runway of Dalian Zhoushuizi International Airport. The Xiamen Airlines flight mistakenly entered runway 10 without informing the tower, and while the China Southern Airlines flight had started its take off roll. The China Southern flight immediately started emergency braking and turned to one side to avoid a collision, and came to a complete stop with the front wheels of the two aircraft only 35 meters apart. After the incident, the Xiamen Airlines flight crew did not follow the tower's instructions to cancel the flight for investigation, and even erased the black box record in an attempt to evade responsibility. The captain of Xiamen Airlines was eventually suspended from flying. The flight operator's rights to operate the flight were also revoked.
 On August 16, 2018, XiamenAir Flight 8667 crash-landed at Manila's Ninoy Aquino International Airport in the Philippines amidst heavy monsoon rains. The Boeing 737-800 skidded off the end of the runway. All 157 passengers and crew were unharmed. According to Flightradar24 data, the flight aborted its first landing attempt. As a result, the accident aircraft was parked on Runway 06/24, which is used for large aircraft, and the runway was closed for a long time until noon on the 18th.

References

External links

Official XiamenAir website—
Official SkyTeam website—

 
Airlines of China
China Southern Airlines
Companies based in Xiamen
Government-owned companies of China
Transport in Fujian
Transport in Xiamen
Airlines established in 1984
Chinese companies established in 1984
Air China
SkyTeam
Chinese brands